NewFest: The New York Lesbian, Gay, Bisexual, & Transgender Film Festival put on by The New Festival, Inc., is one of the most comprehensive forums of national and international LGBT film/video in the world.

Founded in 1988, The New Festival, Inc is a non-profit media arts organization dedicated to showcasing the newest and best LGBT media for the greater New York metropolitan area.

As a partner in the first national LGBTQ media arts organization, NewFest hopes to expand its goals all over the country. NewFest strives to encourage and foster environments for LGBTQ and allied filmmakers and viewers to represent the diversity and complexity of voices in the LGBTQ community, and to amplify those voices across the nation.

List of Events 
The largest and most popular program from the New Festival is the week long NewFest LGBT film festival. Additionally, year-round events include: NewFest@BAM an annual "Best of NewFest" showcase at the landmark Brooklyn Academy of Music's Rose Cinemas; NewDraft, a screenplay reading and competition; and the Logo Lounge, which provides a space for viewers, producers, screenplays, and filmmakers can mingle and network during the film festival.

NewFest has partnered with the LGBT Center in NYC to screen films on a monthly basis at the Center. Screenings to include discussions with the filmmakers.

In 2020, the festival was one of the key partners, alongside Outfest Los Angeles, the Frameline Film Festival and the Inside Out Film and Video Festival, in the North American Queer Festival Alliance, an initiative to further publicize and promote LGBT film.

Grand Jury Award Winners 
2020: Cowboys, Welcome to the USA, and Keyboard Fantasies: The Beverly Glenn-Copeland Story
2019: Tremors and Queen of Lapa
2018: Jules of Light and Dark, Retablo, and Sidney & Friends
2017: The Feels, The City of the Future, and Alabama Bound
2011: Circumstance and Gone
2010: The Topp Twins: Untouchable Girls
2009:  and Prodigal Sons
2008: The Lost Coast, The Amazing Truth About Queen Raquela, and Be Like Others
2007: Times Have Been Better and Saving Marriage
2006: The Gymnast, Go West, and Camp Out
2005: A Year Without Love and Little Man
2004: You I Love and Garden
2003: Between Two Women, I Exist, and The Gift
2002: The Ignorant Fairies and Out in the Cold
2001: O Fantasma and Bombay Eunuch
2000: Water Drops on Burning Rocks and Our House: A Very Real Documentary About Kids of Gay & Lesbian Parents
1997: Chocolate Babies and You Don't Know Dick: Courageous Hearts of Transsexual Men

Audience Award Winners 
2020: Dating Amber and Cured
2019: And Then We Danced and A Night at Switch n' Play
2018: Rafiki and Man Made
2017: A Date for Mad Mary and Hot to Trot
2016: Suicide Kale and Political Animals
2015: Those People and The Same Difference
2014: The Way He Looks
2013: Free Fall, Out in the Dark and Valentine Road
2012: My Best Day and Love Free or Die
2011: The Wise Kids, Turtle Hill, Brooklyn, and One Night Stand
2010: Children of God
2009: Mississippi Damned and Florent: Queen of the Meat Market
2008: Pageant
2007: Out at the Wedding
2006: Cruel and Unusual
2005: Left Lane: On the Road with Folk Poet Alix Olson
2004: Girl Play
2003: Brother Outsider: The Life of Bayard Rustin
2002: Ruthie and Connie: Every Room in the House
2001: The Iron Ladies

See also 
 List of film festivals in New York
 List of LGBT film festivals
 Cinema of the United States
 LGBT culture in New York City

References

External links
 The New Festival, Inc.
  NewFest on Facebook
 BAM Rose Cinemas
 Pioneer Theater
 Cinepolis USA - Chelsea
 OutFest
 List of LGBT Film Festivals

Film festivals established in 1988
LGBT events in New York (state)
Film festivals in New York City
LGBT film festivals in the United States
LGBT culture in New York City
1988 establishments in New York City